Michael Marcus may refer to:
 Michael Marcus (politician) (1894–1960), Scottish Labour party MP for Dundee 1929–1931
 Michael Marcus (musician) (born 1952), American jazz musician
 Michael Marcus (actor), English actor
 Michael Marcus (trader) (born 1956), American commodities trader